The 1994 Skoda Czech Open, also known as the Prague Open, was a men's tennis tournament played on outdoor clay courts at the I. Czech Lawn Tennis Club in Prague, Czech Republic  that was part of the ATP World Series of the 1994 ATP Tour. It was the eighth edition of the tournament and was held from 1 August until 7 August 1994. First-seeded Sergi Bruguera won his second successive singles title at the event.

Finals

Singles

 Sergi Bruguera defeated  Andrei Medvedev 6–3, 6–4
 It was Bruguera's 3rd singles title of the year and the 14th of his career.

Doubles

 Karel Nováček /  Mats Wilander defeated  Tomáš Krupa /  Pavel Vízner walkover

See also
 1994 BVV Prague Open – women's tournament

References

External links
 ITF tournament edition details

Czech Open
Prague Open (1987–1999)
Czechoslovak Open